Cromarcha stroudagnesia is a species of snout moth. It was described by Solis in 2003 and is endemic to Costa Rica.

There are two forms, with either a white or light brown ground colour. In both forms, the antemedial and postmedial lines are prominent. Both the upper- and underside of the hindwings have dark brown scales. There are two successive generations, one beginning in May and one in September.

The larvae bore in shoots of Tabebuia ochracea and Handroanthus impetiginosus. There is generally only one larva per shoot. Pupation takes place at the base of the tunnel.

References

Moths described in 2003
Endemic fauna of Costa Rica
Chrysauginae